Eugenio Elia Levi (18 October 1883 – 28 October 1917) was an Italian mathematician, known for his fundamental contributions in group theory, in the theory of partial differential operators and in the theory of functions of several complex variables. He was a younger brother of Beppo Levi and was killed in action during First World War.

Work

Research activity
He wrote 33 papers, classified by his colleague and friend Mauro Picone according to the scheme reproduced in this section.

Differential geometry

Group theory
He wrote only three papers in group theory: in the first one,  discovered what is now called Levi decomposition, which was conjectured by Wilhelm Killing and proved by Élie Cartan in a special case.

Function theory
In the theory of functions of several complex variables he introduced the concept of pseudoconvexity during his investigations on the domain of existence of such functions: it turned out to be one of the key concepts of the theory.

Cauchy and Goursat problems

Boundary value problems
His researches in the theory of partial differential operators lead to the method of the parametrix, which is basically a way to construct fundamental solutions for elliptic partial differential operators with variable coefficients: the parametrix is widely used in the theory of pseudodifferential operators.

Calculus of variations

Publications
The full scientific production of Eugenio Elia Levi is collected in reference .
. A short note announcing the results of paper .
. An important paper whose results were previously announced in the short note  with the same title. It was also translated in Russian by N. D. Ajzenstat, currently available from the All-Russian Mathematical Portal: .
. An important paper in the theory of functions of several complex variables, where the problem of determining what kind of hypersurface can be the boundary of a domain of holomorphy.
.
. His "Collected works" in two volumes, collecting all the mathematical papers of Eugenio Elia Levi in a revised typographical form, both amending typographical errors and author's oversights. A collection of all his published papers (in their original typographical form), probably an unordered uncorrected collection of offprints, is available online at the Internet Archive: .

See also
Pseudoconvexity
Levi decomposition
Parametrix
Several complex variables

Notes

References

Biographical and general references
. Wide source of unpublished manuscript documents of and about E.E. Levi. A short presentation could be found on EGEA website
. It gives many useful information on the family and on the relationship between the two Levi brothers.
. The relation of Enrico D'Ovidio, Luigi Bianchi and Vito Volterra motivating their decision for the awarding of the golden medal of the Accademia Nazionale delle Scienze detta dei XL to Eugenio Elia Levi.
. The most widely known biographical reference on Eugenio Elia Levi, written by Guido Fubini and Gino Loria.
. A pamphlet containing the commemoration of Eugenio Elia Levi pronounced by Gino Loria at the University of Genova on May 29, 1918.
.
. A commemorative paper on Eugenio Elia Levi written by Mauro Picone and included in the first volume of his Opere .
.
. Available from the website of the Società Italiana di Storia delle Matematiche. An ample historical paper written by Francesco Tricomi to commemorate all Italian mathematicians who worked during the first century of the Italian State.
.

External links
.
. The biographical entry about Eugenio Elia Levi in the "Dizionario Biografico degli Italiani (Biographical Dictionary of Italians)" section of the Enciclopedia Treccani.
. Available from the Edizione Nazionale Mathematica Italiana.
 

1883 births
1917 deaths
20th-century Italian mathematicians
University of Pisa alumni
Academic staff of the University of Genoa
20th-century Italian Jews
Complex analysts
Mathematical analysts
PDE theorists